Ranularia sarcostoma, common name : the flesh-coloured hairy triton, is a species of predatory sea snail, a marine gastropod mollusk in the family Cymatiidae.

This species was originally described by Reeve in 1844 as   Cymatium (Ranularia) sarcostoma 

The generic placement is doubtful.

Description
The shell size varies between 50 mm and 103 mm

Distribution
This species is found in the Indian Ocean in the Mascarene Basin and in the Indo-West Pacific.

References

 Drivas, J. & M. Jay (1988). Coquillages de La Réunion et de l'île Maurice

External links
 Reeve, L. A. (1844). Monograph of the genus Triton. In: Conchologia Iconica, or, illustrations of the shells of molluscous animals, vol. 2, pls 1-20 and unpaginated text. L. Reeve & Co., London 
 

Cymatiidae
Gastropods described in 1844